Alena Özel-Hurkova (born ) is a Belarusian former volleyball player, playing as a right side hitter. She was part of the Belarus women's national volleyball team.

She competed at the 2007 Women's European Volleyball Championship. On club level she played for Azərreyl Baku in 2007.

References

External links

1984 births
Living people
Belarusian women's volleyball players
Place of birth missing (living people)
Opposite hitters
Expatriate volleyball players in Azerbaijan
Belarusian expatriate sportspeople in Azerbaijan